Simone Pontisso (born 20 March 1997) is an Italian footballer who plays as a defensive midfielder for  club Catanzaro.

Club career
Pontisso is a youth exponent from Udinese. He made his Serie A debut at 31 May 2015 against Cagliari Calcio. He replaced Stipe Perica at half-time in a 4–3 away defeat.

In July 2016, Pontisso was loaned out to SPAL to play in Serie B.

On 30 January 2019, he signed with Vicenza Virtus.

On 31 January 2022, Pontisso moved to Pescara.

On 5 July 2022, he signed a two-year contract with Catanzaro.

References

External links
 

1997 births
Living people
Sportspeople from Udine
Italian footballers
Udinese Calcio players
S.P.A.L. players
L.R. Vicenza players
Delfino Pescara 1936 players
U.S. Catanzaro 1929 players
Serie A players
Serie B players
Serie C players
Association football midfielders
Footballers from Friuli Venezia Giulia